St. John Mary Vianney Academy is a private Catholic school located in a private subdivision in Mambugan, Antipolo, Rizal, Philippines. The school was formerly known as La Colina Learning Center. It was established in 1982 as a pre-school (Nursery, Kinder, Preparatory) and Elementary School (1st-6th Grade).

References

External links
 
 Saint John Mary Vianney Academy of Antipolo
 Saint John Mary Vianney Academy Website

Schools in Antipolo
1982 establishments in the Philippines
Educational institutions established in 1982